The 1990 Grampian Regional Council election, the fifth election to Grampian Regional Council, was held on 3 May 1990 as part of the wider 1990 Scottish regional elections. The election saw Labour take the most seats, with the Conservatives falling sharply to finish fourth in terms of councillors. The SNP had the highest vote share, and turnout was 41.0%, the lowest for any region in Scotland

Aggregate Results

Ward Results

References 

1990 Scottish local elections
May 1990 events in the United Kingdom